David Daniels is an American commercial director, filmmaker, and co-founder (along with Ray Di Carlo and Chel White) of the Portland, Oregon based animation studio Bent Image Lab.

With a master's degree in Animation from The California Institute of the Arts (Cal Arts), Daniels' expertise includes computer (or CG), clay, foam, character, and mixed-media animation.

History
Early in his career, Daniels animated parts of Pee-wee's Playhouse, and sections of Peter Gabriel's music video "Big Time." David later directed the original twelve M&M's spots, helping define the CGI designs of Yellow, Blue, Red and Green personalities that are still being used decades later. His industry awards include an AICP award, a Clio, Mobius awards and a Daytime Emmy. His clients include Hewlett Packard, Fox, MTV, NBC, Coca-Cola, Pepsi, Nabisco, Mars, Sesame Street, Tinactin (featuring John Madden), and Kellogg's.

Stratacut
David Daniels invented a technique he termed Strata-cut animation, a form of clay animation in which internally packed "loaves" of clay are animated in thin slices, revealing the movement of the pre-sculpted images within. Daniels first used the technique of strata-cut in his 1985 film, Buzz Box. Strata-cut was later used in animated segments of the Pee-wee's Playhouse series during the mid-80s, and in the music video for "Big Time" by Peter Gabriel (1986).

At Bent Image Lab
In 2008, David Daniels and Bent co-founder Ray Di Carlo co-directed "Hidden Formula", a Coca-Cola television commercial created for the advertising agency Santo, in Buenos Aires, Argentina. Since 2014, Daniels has also been developing augmented reality.

Screenings
Daniels' experimental animated film, "Buzz Box Remix" premiered at the 2007 International Film Festival Rotterdam.
His Masterclass presentations in person at Santiago, introduced a new generation of animators firsthand to this unconventional art form. In 2017, David Daniels gave a one-man show at the historic Anthology Film Archives in New York City. Guests not only got to see his legacy of work but Daniels also gave an in-person demonstration.

References

External links 
  Buzz Box on Vimeo
 David Daniels on IMDb
 David Daniels' official Vimeo channel

American film directors
American animators
American animated film directors
American animated film producers
Stop motion animators
Living people
Year of birth missing (living people)
California Institute of the Arts alumni